This is an inclusive list of television programs with science fiction as principal theme, or which contain at least one significant element of science fiction, even if some cross over into other genres.For television programs with fantasy, horror, mystery, paranormal, supernatural and other related themes, please see the respective genres and listings.

Science fiction films, one-time presentations, original net animation (ONA), original video animation (OVA), short films (a.k.a. shorts), serial films (a.k.a. serials) and specials must have been created specifically for or broadcast first (premiere, "first showing") on television or on a streaming channel to qualify for the purpose of this list.Films that premiered ("first presentation") on the "big screen" (theatrical release) or have been distributed direct-to-video (video cassette, tape, betamax, VHS, laser disc, video CD, DVD, HD-DVD, Blu-ray, UHD, digital, etc.) or on the internet do not belong here, even if they aired ("second presentation", rerun) at some point on a TV/streaming channel. Please see the lists of science fiction films for more details.

Complete listing in alphabetical order

0–9

A

B

C

D

E

F

G

H

I

J

K

L

M

N

O

P

Q

R

S

T

U

V

W

X

Y

Z

Genres

See also

Listings
Television films:
List of science fiction television films
List of television programs based on films
List of films based on television programs
Television networks:
Lists of television channels
List of Sci Fi Channel (Australia) programs
List of Syfy Universal (France) programs
List of Syfy (United Kingdom) programmes
List of Syfy (United States) programs
List of Sci Fi Pictures original films
Genres:
List of science fiction themes
List of alternate history fiction: TV shows
List of apocalyptic, post-apocalyptic and World War III science fiction television programs
List of cyberpunk works: Animation
List of cyberpunk works: Television
List of fiction containing teleportation: Television
List of fiction employing parallel universes: Television
List of fictional automobiles: Graphic novels, comics & animation
List of fictional automobiles: Television and radio
List of fictional computers: Television
List of fictional extraterrestrials
List of fictional robots and androids: Animated shorts/series
List of fictional robots and androids: Television films and series
List of fictional gynoids: In animation
List of fictional gynoids: In US television
List of fictional spacecraft
List of fictional universes
List of fictional vehicles: Television
List of military science fiction works and authors: Television and film
List of nuclear holocaust fiction: Animation shorts
List of nuclear holocaust fiction: Television programs
List of science fiction sitcoms
List of space opera media: Anime
List of space opera media: Film and television
List of steampunk works: In television
List of time travel science fiction: Television series
List of science fiction genres
Comics based:
List of television series based on DC Comics
List of television series based on Marvel Comics
Countries/Regions:
List of television programs
List of Australian television series: Science fiction
List of British television series
List of English-language Canadian television series
List of French-language Canadian television series
List of science fiction TV and radio shows produced in Canada
List of Colombian television series
List of Finnish television series
List of French television series
List of television stations in India
List of Hong Kong television series
List of Hungarian television series
List of Japanese television series
List of Lebanese television series
List of Philippine television shows
List of Puerto Rican television series
List of South Korean television series
List of Norwegian television series
List of New Zealand television series
List of South African television series
List of Spanish television series
List of Swedish television series
Animated:
List of animated television series
List of animated television series from 2000s
List of animated short series
Television networks:
List of programs broadcast by Boomerang
List of programs broadcast by Cartoon Network
List of programs broadcast by Cartoon Quest
List of Cookie Jar Entertainment programs
List of programs broadcast by Disney XD
List of programs broadcast by Fox Kids
List of programs broadcast by Kids' WB
List of programs broadcast by Jetix
List of programs broadcast by Nickelodeon
List of programs broadcast by Nicktoons
List of programs broadcast by Nick Jr.
List of programs broadcast by The N
List of programs broadcast by TeenNick
List of programs broadcast by Toon Disney

Locations
Countries:
Australasian science fiction television
British television science fiction
Canadian science fiction television
Continental European science fiction television
Japanese television science fiction: Anime
Japanese television science fiction (tokusatsu): Live-action
U.S. television science fiction
Television networks:
AXN Beyond (Asia-Pacific)
AXN Sci Fi (Europe)
SyFy network:
Sci Fi Channel (Australia)
Syfy Universal (Benelux)
Sci Fi Channel (Germany)
Universal Channel (Japan)
Sci Fi Channel (Latin America)
Sci Fi Channel (Philippines)
Sci Fi Channel (Poland)
Syfy Universal (Portugal)
Sci Fi Channel (Romania)
Syfy Universal (Russia)
Sci Fi Channel (Serbia)
Syfy Universal (Spain)
SPACE (Canada)
TV4 Science fiction (Sweden)
Zone Fantasy (Italy)

Genres
Science fiction on television
Alien invasion
Alternate future
Alternate History: Television
Anthology series: Television
Artificial intelligence in fiction
Augmented reality: Television & film
Biopunk: Film and television
Comic science fiction: Television
Cyberpunk: Film and television
Cyborgs in fiction: Television
Extraterrestrials in fiction
Feminist science fiction: Film and television
Fictional universe
Flying car (fiction): Science fiction
Gender in speculative fiction: Television
Hyperspace
Interstellar war
Invisibility in fiction: Television
LGBT themes in speculative fiction: Television
Lost World
Mecha anime
Military science fiction
Mind uploading
Nuclear weapons in popular culture: In fiction, film and theater
Nuclear weapons in popular culture: List of visual depictions
Parallel universe: Television
Planetary romance: In film and television
Planets in science fiction
Political ideas in science fiction
Real Robot
Resizing
Science fantasy
Science fiction Western: Television
Sex and sexuality in speculative fiction
Simulated reality in fiction: Animation, anime and cartoons
Simulated reality in fiction: Television
Slipstream
Space marine: Films and TV
Space opera
Space stations and habitats in popular culture
Space warfare in fiction: Television and movies
Space western: Television
Spy-fi: Anime
Spy-fi: Films and television series
Steampunk
Super Robot
Superhero fiction: Animation
Superhero fiction: Live-action television series
Superhuman: Science fiction
Survivalism in fiction: Television programs
Time travel in fiction
UFOs in fiction: Television
Utopian and dystopian fiction
Virtual reality: Television
Wormholes in fiction: Television
Zombie apocalypse: Television

Animation
Animation
Anime
Adult animation
Animated series
Television networks:
ABC Kids (US)
BBC Kids (Canada)
Boing (Italy)
Cartoon Network (US)
CBBC (UK)
CBS Kidshow (US)
Chutti TV (India)
Disney Channel (US)
Disney XD (US)
Filmation (US)
Kix! (UK)
TEENick (US)
Teletoon (English) (Canada)
Télétoon (French) (Canada)
Toon Disney (US)
Tooncast (Latin America)
UPN Kids (US)
USA Action Extreme Team (US)
USA Cartoon Express (US)
YTV (Canada)

References

Television Programs

Lists of television shows
Lists of television series by genre
Lists of television series
American television-related lists
Children's television series